Sutradharulu is a 1989 Indian Telugu-language drama film written and directed by K. Viswanath. It stars Akkineni Nageswara Rao, Bhanuchander, and Ramya Krishna. The music is composed by K. V. Mahadevan. It is produced by Sudhakar and Karunakar under the Sudarshan Cine Enterprises banner.

This film is based on a story against violence shown in a rural background. This message is shown in a short graphic format as an introduction to the film. The film received National Film Award for Best Feature Film in Telugu, and three state Nandi Awards (including Third Best Feature Film).

Plot
The film begins in a village where Neelakantam (Satyanarayana) a tyrant who tramples the public under his feet. In the same village, Hanumanth Dasu (Akkineni Nageswara Rao) and his brother-in-law Rangadasu (Murali Mohan) belong to a Haridasa family. Once Neelakantam molests an orthodox Brahmin woman Yashodamma (K.R.Vijaya) wife of a Bhagavathar Acharyulu (Ashok Kumar). So, Yashodamma forfeits herself to be his wife and discards from his life along with Tirumala Dasu (Bhanuchander), son of Hanumathu Dasu with the intention of giving him a good education. After 20 years, Tirumala Dasu (Bhanu Chander) returns to the village as a district collector. In the beginning, Tirumala Dasu pretends as if he is supporting Neelakantam, according to the guidance of his father to get a revolution in public and they succeed in it. Parallelly, Seeta (Ramya Krishna) daughter of Rangadasu who loves Tirumala Dasu a lot also dislikes him but afterward realizes his virtue. Right now, Neelakantam ploys to conquer the Govt lands for which he initiates Tirumala Dasu to get them to auction. Here, Tirumala Dasu clearly takes bribe from different landlords and uses it to acquire the land by the villagers. At present, enraged Neelakhantam intrigues to destroy the village with the help of other landlords when Tirumala Dasu ceases them. Being cognizant of it, the villagers unite to kill Neelakantam when Hanumath Dasu stops and pacifies them that violence is not the solution to resolve a problem. Finally, Neelakantam also realizes his mistake, sheds all his weapons and reforms as a good person. Even Yashodamma reunites with her husband. At last, Hanumanth Dasu affirms that it's wiser to give best punishment for egregious persons is to destroy their evil nature than eliminating them. Finally, it is proclaimed that Nonviolence is great piety

Cast
 Akkineni Nageswara Rao as Hanumath Dasu
 Bhanuchander as Tirumala Dasu
 Ramya Krishna as Seethalu
 Satyanarayana as Neelakantam
 Murali Mohan as Rangadasu
 K. R. Vijaya as  Yashodamma
 Sujatha as Devamma
 Srilakshmi as Panchashari
 Ashok Kumar as Acharyulu
 Sakshi Ranga Rao
 Vankayala Satyanarayana
 Kota Sankar Rao
 Gokina Rama Rao
 Potti Prasad
 Badi Tataji
 Murali Krishna Maddali

Soundtrack

Music composed by K. V. Mahadevan. Music released on ADITYA Music Company.

Reception 
Griddaluru Gopalrao in his review for Zamin Ryot opined that the film lacks novelty, and the talent of the lead cast is not fully realised.

Awards
 National Film Awards of 1989
 Best Feature Film in Telugu - Sudhakar & Karunakar

 Nandi Awards - 1989
Third Best Feature Film - Sudhakar & Karunakar
Best Audiographer – Swaminathan
Special Jury Award – K. R. Vijaya

References

External links
 

1989 films
1980s Telugu-language films
Films directed by K. Viswanath
Films scored by K. V. Mahadevan
Best Telugu Feature Film National Film Award winners